Chelonaplysilla  is a genus of sponges in the family Darwinellidae.

Species
Chelonaplysilla americana van Soest, 2017
Chelonaplysilla arenosa (Topsent, 1925)
Chelonaplysilla aurea Bergquist, 1995
Chelonaplysilla betinensis Zea & van Soest, 1986
Chelonaplysilla delicata Pulitzer-Finali & Pronzato, 1999
Chelonaplysilla erecta (Row, 1911)
Chelonaplysilla incrustans (Carter, 1876)
Chelonaplysilla noevus (Carter, 1876)
Chelonaplysilla psammophila (Topsent, 1928)
Chelonaplysilla supjiensis Jeon & Sim, 2008
Chelonaplysilla violacea (Lendenfeld, 1883)

References

External links